The Roman Catholic Diocese of Alcalá de Henares  is a diocese located in the city of Alcalá de Henares in the Ecclesiastical province of Madrid in Spain.

History
An ancient diocese of Complutum (the current Alcala de Henares) was founded in the IV or V century but it was abolished under the muslim government (VIII-XI century) and not restored by the Christian Kings and its territory given to the Archdiocese of Toledo. In 1885 a Diocese of Madrid and Alcala (suffragan of Toledo) was founded, now the Archdiocese of Madrid.

On July 23, 1991, it was established as Diocese of Alcalá de Henares from the Archdiocese of Madrid (as its suffragan diocese), with the latin name of Complutensis to remember the ancient diocese.

Bishops
 Manuel Ureña Pastor (23 July 1991 – 1 July 1998)
 Jesús Esteban Catalá Ibáñez (27 April 1999 – 10 October 2008)
 Juan Antonio Reig Pla (7 March 2009 – 21 September 2022)
 Jesús Vidal (administrator)

Curiosities
The diocese has a pop-rock group of Catholic music called The Voice of the Desert that is made up of three diocesan priests and four laymen. This musical group born in 2004 has given concerts throughout Spain, in the United States and in Panama, participating twice with their music in the World Youth Day.

See also
Roman Catholicism in Spain

Sources
 GCatholic.org
 Catholic Hierarchy
  Diocese website

References

Roman Catholic dioceses in Spain
Roman Catholic dioceses established in 1991
Alcalá de Henares
Roman Catholic dioceses and prelatures established in the 20th century
1991 establishments in Spain